Scott Rankin (born 1959) is an Australian theatre director, writer and co-founder and creative director of the arts and social change company Big hART. Based in Tasmania, Rankin works in and with isolated communities and diverse cultural settings, as well as in commercial performance.

Early life and education 
Rankin was born in 1959 in Sydney and grew up there. His parents were businesspeople who owned an early learning specialist toyshop and lived on a Chinese junk in Lane Cove, moored in Sydney Harbour for 21 years. 

Rankin enrolled in an arts degree but did not complete it, instead working in a retirement village and offering music workshops to homeless youth. Since 1981, he has mainly lived and worked from the far north-west coast of Tasmania.

Work
As creative director of Big hART and as playwright and director, Rankin has created or collaborated on many large-scale Australian stage productions: Namatjira for the Namatjira family; Ngapartji Ngapartji for Trevor Jamieson, Box the Pony for Leah Purcell; RiverlanD for Wesley Enoch; StickybrickS for the Northcott Public Housing community in Surry Hills, Sydney; Junk Theory for the Sutherland Shire, as well as internationally touring works such as Certified Male.

Recognition
Rankin is a Fellow of the Australia Council for the Arts.

Rankin and his theatre works have received many awards, including:
2000: Human Rights Award
2000: New South Wales Premier's Literary Award, for Box the Pony
2000: Queensland Premier's Literary Award, for Box the Pony<
2002: Ros Bower Award for Community Cultural Development
2004: Three Melbourne Green Room Awards for Beasty Girl (most innovative work, best female actor in leading role (Leah Purcell), best direction)
 Two Green Room Award Nominations for Namatjira (best production and best actor (Trevor Jamieson));
 Two Sydney Theatre Critics Awards (best new Australian work and best newcomer (Derik Lynch) and another 6 nominations (best mainstage production, best direction, best actor in a leading role, best actor in a supporting role, best lighting design and best score or sound design);
 Deadly Award (most outstanding achievement in film, TV or theatre)
Critics Choice ArtsHub Award
 Helpmann Award
World Health Organization Award for Safe Communities
2018: Tasmanian state recipient, Australian of the Year 

His works have been included in many arts festivals, including Melbourne, Adelaide, Perth, Brisbane, Sydney, Edinburgh, and the Tasmanian Ten Days on the Island Festival. He has also toured to Sweden, Iceland, Ireland, Scotland, England, South Africa, New Zealand, Germany and the Netherlands.

List of works

List of Rankin's works (in reverse chronological order):

 Hipbone Sticking Out (forthcoming 2013)
 Namatjira (2010),
 Beat Bop Road (2009)
 This is Living (2009)
 Nyuntu Ngali (2009)
 Ngapartji Ngapartji (2008)
 StickybrickS (2007)
 Brave Men Run in Our Family (2007)
 Junk Theory (2007)
 Riverland (2004)
 Beasty Girl: The Secret Life of Errol Flynn (2003)
 What the World Needs Now (2002)
 Career Highlights of the Mamu (2002)
 Leaves Falling at Midnight (2001)
 Certified Male (1999)
 Pumping Irony (1999)
 Pandora's Shed (1998)
 Box the Pony (1997)
 Glynn Nicholas Group – Wrung Out (1996)
 Three Men Walk into a Bar (1996)
 Girl / Pandora Slams the Lid (1994)
 Pandora Slams the Lid (1993)
 Girl
 Kissing Frogs (1991)
 Glynn With a Why? (1988)

References

Further reading
Albert, Jane: "The Rankin File (Interview with playwright, Scott Rankin)", in: The Australian, 1–2 February 2003, pp. 16–17.

Rankin, Scott & Nicholas, Glynn: Certified Male: Let's Face It...Men Are Funny Buggers: Songs & Highlights from the Hit Show, sound recording, Balaclava: Art Cackle & Hoot, 2000.
Rankin, Scott: Namatjira: Written for the Namatjira Family (Aranda); and, Ngapartji Ngapartji: Written for Trevor Jamieson (Pitjantjatjara), Strawberry Hills: Currency Press, 2012.
Rankin, Scott: "DIY Virtuosity Versus Professional Mediocrity", in: Australasian Drama Studies, (52) April 2008, p. 97–112.

External links

1959 births
Living people
Writers from Sydney
Australian dramatists and playwrights
Australian theatre directors